Panayanthitta Kunhiraman Nair (4 October 1905 – 27 May 1978), also known as Mahakavi P, was an Indian writer of Malayalam literature. He was known for his romantic poems which detailed the natural beauty of his home state of Kerala in South India as well as the realities of his life and times. He received the inaugural Kerala Sahitya Akademi Award for Poetry in 1959. He was also a recipient of the Sahitya Akademi Award.

Biography 

P. Kunhiraman Nair was born on January 5, 1906, at Bellikoth near Kanhangad, in Kasaragod district of the south Indian state of Kerala to Puravankara Kunjambu Nair, a Sanskrit scholar, physician and vedantin and his wife, Panayanthitta Kunjamma Amma. His early schooling was with traditional teachers as well as at the local primary school before studying Sanskrit at the school run by Punnassery Nambi Neelakanda Sharma in Pattambi (the present-day Sree Neelakanta Government Sanskrit College Pattambi) where he was reported to be a lazy student.

It was during this time, Nair started writing poems. He also fell in love with a local girl by name, Vattoli Kunjilakshmy. Subsequently, he moved to Tanjavur to continue his Sanskrit and Vedanta studies when his family arranged his marriage with Puravankara Janaki Amma, his cousin and bride-designate as per local customs. However, he declined the proposal and instead, married his lover, Kunjilakshmy. After marriage, he founded a magazine, Navajeevan, which was published from Kannur but after the publication became defunct, he worked at Saraswathi Press in Thrissur and Sree Ramakrishnodayam Press in Olavakkode. Later, he joined Koodali High School as a Malayalam teacher ad after a while, moved to Rajas High School Kollengode from where he superannuated from service. He died on May 27, 1978, at the age of 72, while he was staying at C. P. Sathram, a lodging facility in Thiruvananthapuram. He is survived by his son, P. Ravindran Nair and daughter, Radha.

Legacy 

P., as he was popularly known, was a habitual nomad and was reported to have led a bohemian lifestyle, wandering across Kerala, living in several places, meeting their people and making them part of his life and literature. Poetry formed his main genre of work, though he has also written novels, short stories, articles and plays. While during the initial stages of his literary career, Nair wrote spiritual poems, Nirapara published in 1944, started a new phase which showed his leaning towards nature and symbolism. His autobiography, Kaviyude Kaalpaadukal (The Footprints of a Poet), with foreword by M. T. Vasudevan Nair, is one of the celebrated works in prose in Malayalam. Thamarathoni, written during his days in Kollengode, Kaliyachan, Vayalkarayil, Ratholsavam and Pookkalam are a few of his known poems.

Honours 

The Raja of Nileshwaram honoured Nair with the title Bhakthakavi and presented him with a veerashrungala (golden bracelet) in 1949 and he received the title of Sahitya Nipunan in 1963 from the Raja of Kochi. Kerala Sahitya Akademi selected Kaliyachan of Kunhiraman Nair for their inaugural Kerala Sahitya Akademi Award for Poetry in 1959. He received the Kendra Sahithya Academy Award for his work, Thamarathoni, in 1967.

In 1981, Eyamkode Sreedharan, with the help of Venugopala Varma, the then Raja of Kollengode who donated a plot of land, initiated the efforts to build a memorial for the poet in Kollengode which was subsequently taken up by the Government of Kerala to establish the Mahakavi P. Memorial Art and Culture Centre. The centre houses music school, a library, Kerala Kalabhavan which is a school for kathakali. The centre also holds performances in folk and classical art forms such as Kathakali, Kanyarkali and Porattukali.

A government vocational school at Nair's native place, Bellikoth, has been named after him as Mahakavi P. Smaraka Government Vocational Higher Secondary School and a town hall in Kanhangad has been named Mahakavi P Memorial Hall. Kanhangad also has another memorial of the poet, Mahakavi P. Memorial which was designed by M. V. Devan and houses a library and a public reading room. The upper floor of the building has since been converted into a museum and all the books and articles written by the poet, the chair and dresses used by him, as well as a gold chain presented by the Guruvayur Devaswomm on his 60th birthday are in display there. There are two eponymous organizations, Mahakavi P Foundation, based in Thiruvananthapuram and Mahakavi P. Smaraka Samithi, based in Kanhangad; the former has instituted an annual literary award, Kaliyachan Award and the latter manages two awards for recognising excellence in Malayalam poetry, the Mahakavi P Memorial Award for Poetry and Poetry Award for Young Poets.

In popular culture
Ivan Megharoopan, a 2012 Malayalam biopic, written and directed by P. Balachandran with Prakash Bare in the lead role, is based on the life of poet as detailed in his autobiography, Kaviyude Kalpadukal. His 1959 poem Kaliyachan, has been adapted into a feature film produced by the National Film Development Corporation under the same name with Manoj K. Jayan in the lead; the film received three awards at the 2012 Kerala State Film Awards.

Bibliography

Poetry

Short stories and novels

Plays

Prose

Memoirs and biography

Translations

References

External links

 
 

Malayalam poets
1905 births
1978 deaths
People from Kasaragod district
Recipients of the Sahitya Akademi Award in Malayalam
Recipients of the Kerala Sahitya Akademi Award
20th-century Indian poets
Malayalam-language writers
Poets from Kerala
Indian male poets
20th-century Indian male writers
Indian male novelists
Indian male short story writers
Indian male dramatists and playwrights
Indian male essayists